Welshpool is a town in Wales, UK.

Welshpool or Welsh Pool may also refer to:

Wales
 Welshpool railway station
 Welshpool Airport, aerodrome near Welshpool
 Welshpool Town F.C., a football team

Australia
 Welshpool, Western Australia, a suburb of Perth, Western Australia
 Welshpool railway station, Perth
 Welshpool Road
 Electoral district of Welshpool
 Welshpool, Victoria, a small town in South Gippsland
 Port Welshpool, Victoria, a small town in South Gippsland

Elsewhere
 Welsh Pool, the former name of Lionville, Pennsylvania, a census-designated place in the US